Baron Howard of Penrith, of Gowbarrow in the County of Cumberland, is a title in the Peerage of the United Kingdom. It was created in 1930 for the diplomat Sir Esme Howard, who had previously served as British Ambassador to the United States. A member of the famous Howard family, he was the grandson of Lord Henry Howard-Molyneux-Howard, younger brother of Bernard Howard, 12th Duke of Norfolk.  the title is held by his grandson, the third Baron, who succeeded his father in 1999. Lord Howard of Penrith is also in remainder to the dukedom of Norfolk and its subsidiary titles.

Henry Howard and Sir Stafford Howard, brothers of the first Baron, were both Members of Parliament. The first baron Esme Howard's sons included Henry Anthony Camillo Howard and Hubert Howard.

Barons Howard of Penrith (1930)
Esme William Howard, 1st Baron Howard of Penrith (1863–1939)
Francis Philip Raphael Howard, 2nd Baron Howard of Penrith (1905–1999)
Philip Esme Howard, 3rd Baron Howard of Penrith (b. 1945)

The heir apparent is the present holder's son, Hon. Thomas Philip Howard (b. 1974).

See also
Duke of Norfolk
Earl of Carlisle
Earl of Suffolk (1603 creation)
Earl of Berkshire
Earl of Effingham
Baron Howard de Walden
Viscount FitzAlan of Derwent
Greystoke Castle

References

Kidd, Charles, Williamson, David (editors). Debrett's Peerage and Baronetage (1990 edition). New York: St Martin's Press, 1990.

Baronies in the Peerage of the United Kingdom
Noble titles created in 1930